The Convention on Certain Questions Relating to the Conflict of Nationality Laws was a League of Nations convention adopted during the League of Nations Codification Conference, 1930 in The Hague. It was signed by many states, but ratified by only twenty three.

It was the first international attempt to ensure that all natural persons had a nationality, and to resolve some of the issues from conflict of possible nationalities. This was later refined by the 1961 Convention on the Reduction of Statelessness, the 1963 Convention on the Reduction of Cases of Multiple Nationality and on Military Obligations in Cases of Multiple Nationality and the 1997 European Convention on Nationality.

Article 1 
The first article states that it is up to every state to set its own nationality laws; however, that that power is limited:

 It is for each State to determine under its own law who are its nationals. This law shall be recognised by other States in so far as it is consistent with international conventions, international custom, and the principles of law generally recognised with regard to nationality.

However, the Convention recognised that individual national laws without regarding the broader international scope could lead to statelessness. Citing that acquisition and loss of nationality typically occurred by birth, minority, or marriage, the Convention made proposals to counter the rise of statelessness.

See also
Master Nationality Rule

References

League of Nations treaties